FLM Aviation was a German aviation company based at Kiel-Holtenau Airport.

History
The company was founded in 1976 by Ernst-Otto Mohrdiek near Hamburg Airport, Uetersen founded and subsequently took on its operations. On 1 February 2013, the company had to apply for insolvency.

Operations

FLM Aviation mainly flew executive charter flights, but also sightseeing, cargo and ambulance flights. At times FLM Aviation operated scheduled flights on behalf of dauair and for Manx2 to and from the Isle of Man.

Fleet
As of September 2010, the FLM Aviation fleet consisted of th following aircraft:

 1 Beech Super King Air 300
 3 Dornier 228
 1 Partenavia P68
 6 Cessna 150/172

References

External links 
 Official website (archive)

Defunct airlines of Germany
Companies based in Kiel
Airlines established in 1976
Airlines disestablished in 2013
1976 establishments in West Germany
German companies disestablished in 2013
German companies established in 1976